The men's halfpipe competition of the 2018 Winter Olympics was held from 13 to 14 February 2018 at the Bogwang Phoenix Park in Pyeongchang, South Korea. The event was won by Shaun White, who previously won this event in 2006 and 2010. Ayumu Hirano, the 2014 silver medalist, took silver. Scott James became the bronze medalist. For James, this is the first Olympic medal, and this was also the second medal for Australia at the 2018 Winter Olympics.

In the victory ceremony, the medals were presented by John Dowling Coates, member of the International Olympic Committee, accompanied by Dexter Paine, International Ski Federation vice president.

Qualification

The top 30 athletes in the Olympic quota allocation list qualified, with a maximum of four athletes per National Olympic Committee (NOC) allowed. All athletes qualifying must also have placed in the top 30 of a FIS World Cup event or the FIS Freestyle Ski and Snowboarding World Championships 2017 during the qualification period (July 1, 2016 to January 21, 2018) and also have a minimum of 50 FIS points to compete. If the host country, South Korea at the 2018 Winter Olympics, did not qualify, their chosen athlete would displace the last qualified athlete, granted all qualification criterion was met.

Due to an injury, the 2014 Olympic Champion Iouri Podladtchikov was not able to defend his title. He was qualified but in Pyeongchang he decided not to compete. Podladtchikov crashed during the X-Games in January.

Results

Qualification
 Q — Qualified for the Final

The top 12 athletes in the qualifiers move on to the medal round.

Final
The final was held at 11:30 on 14 February 2018. Yuto Totsuka was injured during his second run, coming down on the edge of the halfpipe and injuring his hip. He was taken off the halfpipe by a team of paramedics and taken to a local hospital. As a result, he was unable to compete in the third round of the finals.

References

Men's snowboarding at the 2018 Winter Olympics